Mulatupo Airport  is an airport serving the Caribbean island town of Mulatupo, in the Guna Yala comarca (indigenous province) of Panama.

Approach and departure to either end of the runway will be over the water.

Airlines and destinations

See also

Transport in Panama
List of airports in Panama

References

External links
OpenStreetMap - Mulatupo

Airports in Panama
Guna Yala